Viltsovo is a rural locality (a village) in Seletskoye Rural Settlement, Suzdalsky District, Vladimir Oblast, Russia. The population was 10 as of 2010. There are 2 streets.

Geography 
Viltsovo is located 24 km northeast of Suzdal (the district's administrative centre) by road. Kharitonovo is the nearest rural locality.

References 

Rural localities in Suzdalsky District